The 2015 Sudirman Cup was the fourteenth tournament of the Sudirman Cup. It was held in Dongguan, China.

Host city selection
Dongguan is the only city to submit a bid for 2015 Sudirman Cup. Badminton World Federation awarded the event to Dongguan during BWF Council Meeting in Athens, Greece.

Seedings
The seedings for teams competing in the tournament were released on March 5, 2015. It was based on aggregated points from the best players in the world ranking. The tournament was divided into four groups, with twelve teams in the elite group competing for the title. Eight teams were seeded into second and third groups and seven teams were seeded into fourth group. The draw was held on March 16, 2015.

Group 1

Group 2

Group 3

Group 4

Squads

Group 1

Group stage

Group 1A

Group 1B

Group 1C

Group 1D

|}

Knockout stage
The draw for the quarterfinals was held after the completion of the final matches in the group stage on May 13, 2015.

Bracket

Quarterfinal

Semifinal

Final

Group 2

Group 2A

Group 2B

13th to 20th place classification

Group 3

Group 3A

Group 3B

21st to 28th place classification

Group 4

Group 4A

Group 4B

29th to 35th place classification

Final standings

References

2015
Sudirman Cup
Sudirman Cup
2015 Sudirman Cup
International sports competitions hosted by China